Clark Island is an island 2 nautical miles (3.7 km) long in eastern Amundsen Sea. It is the largest island of a small group lying 38 nautical miles (70 km) west-southwest of Canisteo Peninsula. Mapped by United States Geological Survey (USGS) from surveys and U.S. Navy air photos, 1960–66. Named by Advisory Committee on Antarctic Names (US-ACAN) for F. Jerry Clark who participated in United States Antarctic Research Program (USARP) glaciological-geophysical work at Roosevelt Island, 1961–62, and on traverses from Byrd Station, 1963–64.

See also 
 List of antarctic and sub-antarctic islands

Islands of Antarctica